Jojo's World, also known as When A Woman Chases A Man, is a 2017 Taiwanese television series created and produced by EBC. It stars Tia Lee, Jacob Hwang, Yen-j, Jason Hsu, Andy Wu and Sharon Hsu as the main cast. Filming commenced in June 2017 and ended on 2 October 2017. It was first broadcast on 5 August 2017 on TTV and airs every Saturday night from 10pm to 11.30pm.

Cast

Main cast
 Tia Lee 李毓芬 as Lin Chun-jiao 林春嬌 (Jojo)
  黃仁德 as Yi Sheng 易盛 (Louis)
 Yen-j 嚴爵 as Tang Zai-qin 唐在勤
 Jason Hsu 許孟哲 as  Li Bi-he 李必合	
 Andy Wu 吳岳擎 as Zhang Xiao-shuo 張曉碩
 Sharon Hsu 許維恩 as Ding Shu-qi 丁書琪

Supporting cast
  王彩樺 as Jiang Shu-fen 江淑芬	
  馬念先 as Ma Ke-wang 馬可王
 Michael Hsu 徐崧育 as Jiang Xin-xing 江心星
 Ma Yun-ting 馬韻婷 as Xuan Xuan 宣宣
 Huang Yu-ting 黃郁婷 as Vivi
 Xiang Nai-er 香奈兒 as Song Hui-en 宋慧恩
  岱毅 as Xiao Wu 小伍
 Yang Zhen 楊震 as Ah Pang 阿胖

Guest actors
  陳博正 as temple caretaker
  謝金晶 as Xie Jin Jing 謝金晶
 Riva Chang 張可昀 as Zhang Ke Yun 張可昀
  詹惟中 as vice president
  洪都拉斯 as Chef Ah Wen 阿溫師
 Liao Bai Xiang 廖柏翔 as Xiao Wen 小溫
  林彥君 as Ke Ke 可可
 Tang Qi 唐琪 as Yi Sheng's grandma
  池端玲名 as Lina

Soundtrack
Dilemma 兩難 by Fish Leong 梁静茹
Barely Friends 邊緣朋友 by Yen-j 嚴爵
I am Water 我是水 by Yen-j 嚴爵
I Like (No, I Love) 我喜歡（不，我愛）by Yen-j 嚴爵
Beginning of the End 終於結束的起點 by Mayday 五月天
Love Today by Yen-j 嚴爵 & Xiang Nai-er 香奈兒

Broadcast

Ratings
Competing programmes on rival channels airing at the same time slot were:
 SET Metro - Memory Love
 CTS - Genius Go Go Go
 FTV - Just Dance
 CTV - Mr. Player
 PTS - Days We Stared at the Sun II, Wake Up 2

: The average rating calculation does not include special episode.

References

External links
 Jojo's World TTV Official Website
 Jojo's World EBC Official Website
 Jojo's World on Facebook

2017 Taiwanese television series debuts
2017 Taiwanese television series endings
Taiwan Television original programming
Eastern Television original programming
Taiwanese drama television series
Taiwanese romance television series
Taiwanese romantic comedy television series